Amalocalyx is a genus of plant in family Apocynaceae consisting of lianas often found clinging to trees. It was first described as a genus in 1898.

Three species names have been created in the genus. Some authors recognize all three as distinct species, but the World Checklist maintained by Kew Royal Botanic Garden considers the genus as constituting a single species, Amalocalyx microlobus.

Local names:
 Chinese: 毛车藤 (Pinyin for Mandarin: máo chē téng)
 Laotian: ຊີມ.

References

External links
 Data sheet on "Flora of China".

Flora of China
Flora of Indo-China
Monotypic Apocynaceae genera
Apocyneae